MobiKwik is an Indian payment service provider founded in 2009 that provides a mobile phone-based payment system and digital wallet. Customers can add money to an online wallet that can be used for payments. In 2013 the Reserve Bank of India authorized the company's use of the MobiKwik wallet, and in May 2016 the company began providing small loans to consumers as part of its service.

In November 2016, the company reported having 1.5 million merchants using its service and a user base of 55 million customers. The company employs over 325 people, operating in three segments including consumer payments, fintech, and payment gateway.

Recently, Mobikiwik suspended its e-wallet services from all major crypto exchanges in India from 1 April.

History

MobiKwik was founded in 2009 by husband and wife team Bipin Preet Singh and Upasana Taku. Singh, a 2002 graduate of IIT Delhi, saw an opportunity to improve mobile recharge options. He seeded the company, developed the website and payment options, and rented office space in Dwarka, Delhi. The initial service was a website with a closed wallet facility, but over the years, MobiKwik extended their service to mobile apps. The company initially partnered with online merchants to make their wallet available as a payment option on e-commerce sites.

MobiKwik launched a digital wallet system in 2012 that enabled users to deposit money online to use for bill payments and other features. MobiKwik provides financial services including loan, accident insurance, life insurance, fire insurance, IMPS money transfer, credit card bill payment, mutual funds, and DTH recharge. They also introduced the feature of sending and receiving money via a mobile app. In September 2014, Express Computer reported how MobiKwik was partnering with GoDaddy and other international companies to help them comply with Indian payment regulations.

In April 2015, MobiKwik was used by 15 million users and claimed to be adding one million new customers every month, according to Forbes India Magazine. In a partnership with CashCare, MobiKwik began providing small loans between ₹500–₹2,500 to customers in May 2016. The company launched its MobiKwik Lite mobile app in November 2016, designed for users of older 2G mobile networks and for those in areas with poor internet connectivity. In the same month, MobiKwik had over 1.5 million merchants using its service and 55 million users. Following the 2016 Indian banknote demonetisation in November 2016, MobiKwik realized a 400% increase in financial transactions using the service by late December 2016. In February 2017, the company announced plans to invest approximately $45 million to expand its user base from 50 million to 150 million users in 2017. In June 2017, 80 percent of India's mobile wallet transactions market was performed by Paytm and Mobikwik. In 2019, MobiKwik announced a new partnership with DT One to expand their service internationally. Also in 2019, the company began offering loans, insurance and investment advice.

On 25 February 2021, an Indian security researcher named Rajshekhar Rajaharia claimed that a hacker group called Jordandaven stole the KYC details of nearly 100 million MobiKwik users from a company server and put them up for sale on the dark web.
On 4 March 2021, company denied the claim and said it would take legal action against the researcher. Later, multiple independent researchers and users confirmed that their Mobikwik data was available online, and on 30 March 2021, TechCrunch reported that company was hiring a third-party to conduct a forensic data security audit.

Funding 
In 2013, after founder Singh's initial $250k seed investment, MobiKwik raised $5 million in Series A funding from an unnamed US-based VC firm. In 2015, Series B rounds from Chinese investment firm Tree Line Asia and American firm Sequoia Capital, with participation from US technology company Cisco Systems and financial services company American Express raised an additional $31 million. In May 2016, the company announced a $50 million Series C round, led by Japanese Internet company GMO Internet, and Taiwanese semiconductor firm MediaTek, along with investors including Sequoia and Treeline Asia, bringing company funding to date to more than $80 million.

On 19 June 2017, Medianama reported that Mobikwik had confirmed to them that they had raised $150 million at a valuation of $1 billion from undisclosed investors.

On 3 August 2017, Bajaj Finance picked up 10.83% stake in MobiKwik for ₹225 crores. The Abu Dhabi Investment Authority purchased a 2.7% stake in MobiKwik for $20 million in June 2021.

On 21 July 2021, MobiKwik filed a draft red herring prospectus with the Securities and Exchange Board of India (SEBI) to raise  through an initial public offering (IPO). The Economic Times reported that MobiKwik had reached a valuation of $1 billion in October 2021, following a secondary employee stock ownership sale led by former Blackstone India chief Mathew Cyriac. MobiKwik received approval from SEBI in October and planned to launch its IPO on 4 November. On 23 November 2021, The Economic Times reported that the company was considering postponing its IPO to 2022 because it was facing difficulties finding foreign institutional investors at the desired valuation.

MobiKwik wallet
MobiKwik wallet is a semi closed wallet authorized in 2013 by the Reserve Bank of India (RBI). The RBI license allows the company to create marketplaces where customers can purchase goods and services from third-party vendors, avoiding the reportedly high failure rates of payment gateway transactions in India.

Partnership
MobiKwik payment gateway partnered with Uber in July 2015, which enabled Uber and its drivers to utilize MobiKwik to process debit and credit card payments.

In February 2020, MobiKwik partnered with Google for its mobile recharge search feature launched for Indian users and allows them to do recharge with Google search. The company had also built biller stack for e-commerce companies to integrate bill payments category into their mobile apps.

Mobile app
In November 2016, MobiKwik launched its MobiKwik Lite mobile app aimed at users in poor internet connectivity regions and consumers using older 2G cellular networks. On 8 November 2017, IDFC Bank entered into a strategic partnership with digital payments solution company MobiKwik to launch a co-branded virtual Visa prepaid card for customers of Mobikwik. On 28 May 2020, Mobikwik was removed from Google Play Store because it had a link to Aarogya Setu.

References

Further reading

External links
 

Indian companies established in 2009
E-commerce in India
Mobile payments in India
Payment service providers
Online payments
Privately held companies of India
2009 establishments in Haryana
Cybercrime in India